USS LST-701 was an  built for the United States Navy in World War II. Like many of her class, she was not named and is properly referred to by her hull designation.

LST-701 was laid down on 1 April 1944 at Jeffersonville, Indiana, by the Jeffersonville Boat & Machine Co.; launched on 18 May 1944; and commissioned on 13 June 1944.

Service history
During World War II LST-701 was assigned to the Asiatic-Pacific theater and participated in the Lingayen Gulf landing, January 1945, the Nasugbu operation, January 1945, and the assault and occupation of Okinawa Gunto in April through June 1945.

LST-701 was decommissioned on 13 July 1946, and struck from the Navy Vessel Register on 28 August 1946. She was sold for scrapping on 27 October 1947 to Moore Dry Dock Company, Oakland, California.

LST-701 earned three battle stars for World War II service.

References

See also
 List of United States Navy LSTs
 LSTH

LST-542-class tank landing ships
World War II amphibious warfare vessels of the United States
Ships built in Jeffersonville, Indiana
1944 ships